Mannerheimintie, named after the Finnish military leader and statesman Carl Gustaf Emil Mannerheim, is the main street and boulevard of Helsinki, Finland. It was originally named Heikinkatu, after Robert Henrik Rehbinder, but was renamed after the Winter War. The change of name was also a reference to Mannerheim's victory parade along the road during the Finnish Civil War (1918), after German forces, allied with Mannerheim's Finnish forces, had retaken the city. 

The street begins at Erottaja in the city centre, near the Swedish Theatre and continues in a northernly direction past the Stockmann department store. It then continues as a main thoroughfare past the districts of Kamppi, Töölö, Meilahti, Laakso and Ruskeasuo, until it finally merges into the busy Tampere Highway (E12), which leads outside the city towards Hämeenlinna and Tampere. (Geographically, the highway only ends in central Tampere, as a small street called Kalevan Puistotie.)

Many famous buildings are located on, or near, Mannerheimintie. These include the House of Parliament, the central offices of the Finnish Posti Group, the Finlandia Hall, the National Museum, the Helsinki Opera House, Hotel Marski, and Tilkka.

There are many landmark sculptures by Mannerheimintie. These include the Three Smiths Statue and the Statue of Mannerheim near Kiasma.

There are only two streets running across Mannerheimintie: Nordenskiöldinkatu overground, and Tilkanvierto below it as an underpass. There are many other streets connecting with Mannerheimintie, but all of them either end at Mannerheimintie or continue across it under a different name.

See also
 Hakamäentie
 Tampere Highway
 Vihdintie
 Paasikiven–Kekkosentie

References

Streets in Helsinki
Carl Gustaf Emil Mannerheim